Eriochrysis is a genus of African and Neotropical plants in the grass family.

 Species
 Eriochrysis brachypogon (Stapf) Stapf - tropical + southern Africa - from Senegal to Eswatini
 Eriochrysis cayennensis P.Beauv. - tropical Americas from Chiapas to Uruguay
 Eriochrysis × concepcionensis Killeen - Bolivia, Brazil  (E. cayennensis × E. laxa)
 Eriochrysis filiformis (Hack.) Filg. - Brazil, Paraguay
 Eriochrysis holcoides (Nees) Kuhlm. - Venezuela, Colombia, Brazil, Bolivia, Paraguay
 Eriochrysis laxa Swallen - Brazil, Bolivia, Argentina
 Eriochrysis pallida Munro  - tropical + southern Africa - from Guinea to KwaZulu-Natal
 Eriochrysis purpurata (Rendle) Stapf - tropical Africa from Congo Rep to Zimbabwe
 Eriochrysis rangacharii C.E.C.Fisch.  - Tamil Nadu
 Eriochrysis villosa Swallen -  Brazil (Paraná, Santa Catarina, Rio Grande do Sul) 
 Eriochrysis warmingiana (Hack.) Kuhlm. - Brazil, Paraguay, Bolivia

 formerly included
see Miscanthus Saccharum

References

Andropogoneae
Grasses of Africa
Grasses of South America
Poaceae genera
Taxa named by Palisot de Beauvois